The 1961 Titleholders Championship was the 22nd Titleholders Championship, held April 27–30 at Augusta Country Club in Augusta, Georgia. Mickey Wright won the first of two consecutive Titleholders, one stroke ahead of runners-up Patty Berg and Louise Suggs.

It was the fifth of Wright's thirteen major titles and her 22nd victory on tour.

Wright was tied with Kathy Cornelius for the 36-hole lead at 147 (+3).

Final leaderboard
Sunday, April 30, 1961

Source:

References

Titleholders Championship
Golf in Georgia (U.S. state)
Titleholders Championship
Titleholders Championship
Titleholders Championship
Titleholders Championship
Women's sports in Georgia (U.S. state)